Rajkumar Ranjan Singh, also known as R. K. Ranjan Singh, is an Indian politician and Member of Parliament, Lok Sabha representing the Inner Manipur constituency of Manipur. He is a member of the Bharatiya Janata Party. Currently Singh is the Minister of State for Ministry of Education and Ministry of External Affairs in Second Modi ministry.

References

External links
  Official biographical sketch in Parliament of India website

Narendra Modi ministry
India MPs 2019–present
Lok Sabha members from Manipur
Living people
Bharatiya Janata Party politicians from Manipur
People from Manipur
1952 births